Moret–Veneux-les-Sablons is a railway station in Veneux-les-Sablons and Moret-sur-Loing, Île-de-France, France. It is on the Paris–Marseille railway, and at the beginning of a branch line to Nevers and Clermont-Ferrand.

The station
The station opened in 1858 and is on the Paris–Marseille and Moret–Lyon railway lines. The station is served by Intercités (long distance) and TER (local) services operated by SNCF. The station is served by Transilien line R (Paris-Gare de Lyon).

The first station of Moret opened when the lines to Dijon and Marseille were constructed, in 1851 and 1856 respectively, the local station, named Moret–Saint-Mammès, was in Saint-Mammès. The Moret–Les Sablons station was built in 1858 as part of the Bourbonnais-line, which ran to Clermont-Ferrand.

The station was designed by the architect , one of many he worked on for the railroad company Chemins de fer de Paris à Lyon et à la Méditerranée.

On the Nevers branch there is a small siding, where some trains are stabled.

Train services
The following services  call at Moret-Veneux-les-Sablons as of 2022:
local service (TER Bourgogne-Franche-Comté) Paris–Montereau–Sens–Laroche-Migennes
local service (Transilien R) Paris–Melun–Montereau
local service (Transilien R) Paris–Melun–Nemours–Montargis

Gallery

See also
Transilien Paris–Lyon

References

External links

Transilien Network Map

Railway stations in Seine-et-Marne
Railway stations in France opened in 1858